American singer Romeo Santos has released five studio albums and two live albums.

Albums

Studio albums

Live albums

Singles

As lead artist

Promo singles and other charted songs

 Every song from Utopía was a single. Meaning that none of its songs fit this table chart.

Featured singles

Notes

References

Tropical music discographies
Discographies of American artists